Carbon films are thin film coatings which consist predominantly of the chemical element carbon. They include plasma polymer films, amorphous carbon films (diamond-like carbon, DLC), CVD diamond films as well as graphite films.

Carbon films are produced by deposition using gas-phase deposition processes, in most cases taking place in a vacuum: chemical vapor deposition, CVD or physical vapor deposition, PVD. They are deposited in the form of thin films with film thicknesses of just a few micrometres.

Carbon films make it possible to implement a large number of surface functions, especially in the field of tribology - in other words, in applications where wear is a major factor.

Further reading

Standards 
 ISO 20523:2017 Carbon based films — Classification and designations

External links 
 Website of ISO with details about ISO 20523 including list of content
 Webportal with basic information about the different types of carbon films

Allotropes of carbon
Thin films